{{Infobox saint
|name=The Coronation of the Virgin Mary in Heaven
|feast_day=May 31st (until 1968) August 22nd (present)
|venerated_in=Roman Catholic Church 
|image=Coronation of Virgin Jacopo di mino Montepulciano.jpg
|imagesize=250px
|caption=Sanctae Mariae Coronavi by Giacomo di Mino's Gothic version. Circa 1340–1350|titles=Litany of Loreto by Pope Sixtus V (1587): Queen of Prophets Queen of ApostlesQueen of MartyrsQueen of ConfessorsQueen of Virgins Queen of the PatriarchsQueen of the AngelsQueen assumed into HeavenQueen of Peace Queen of all SaintsQueen of the Most Holy RosaryPope Pius XII (1954):Queen of Heaven  Second Vatican Council (1964): Queen of the Universe (Lumen Gentium, Section #59)
|attributes=Mary crowned in Heaven by Jesus or jointly with God the Father, surrounded by Cherubim and/or Saints 
}}

The Coronation of the Virgin or Coronation of Mary is a subject in Christian art, especially popular in Italy in the 13th to 15th centuries, but continuing in popularity until the 18th century and beyond. Christ, sometimes accompanied by God the Father and the Holy Spirit in the form of a dove, places a crown on the head of Mary as Queen of Heaven. In early versions the setting is a Heaven imagined as an earthly court, staffed by saints and angels; in later versions Heaven is more often seen as in the sky, with the figures seated on clouds. The subject is also notable as one where the whole Christian Trinity is often shown together, sometimes in unusual ways. Crowned Virgins are also seen in Eastern Orthodox Christian icons, specifically in the Russian Orthodox church after the 18th century. Mary is sometimes shown, in both Eastern and Western Christian art, being crowned by one or two angels, but this is considered a different subject.

The subject became common as part of a general increase in devotion to Mary in the Early Gothic period, and is one of the commonest subjects in surviving 14th-century Italian panel paintings, mostly made to go on a side-altar in a church. The great majority of Roman Catholic churches had (and have) a side-altar or "Lady chapel" dedicated to Mary. The subject is still often enacted in rituals or popular pageants called May crownings, although the crowning is performed by human figures.

Official status and feast
The belief in Mary as Queen of Heaven obtained the papal sanction of Pope Pius XII in his encyclical Ad Caeli Reginam (English: 'Queenship of Mary in Heaven') of October 11, 1954. 

The Roman Catholic Church celebrates the feast every August 22, where it replaced the former octave of the Assumption of Mary in 1969, a move made by Pope Paul VI. The feast was formerly celebrated on May 31, at the end of the Marian month, where the present general calendar now commemorates the Feast of the Visitation. In addition, there are Canonical coronations authorized by the Pope which are given to specific Marian images venerated in a particular place.

The Coronation of the Blessed Virgin Mary is the fifth of the Glorious Mysteries of the Rosary (following the Assumption, the fourth Glorious Mystery) and therefore the idea that the Virgin Mother of God was physically crowned as Queen of Heaven after her Assumption is a traditional Catholic belief echoed in the Rosary.

Origin
The scene is the final episode in the Life of the Virgin, and follows her Assumption – not yet dogma in the Middle Ages – or Dormition.  The scriptural basis is found in the Song of Songs (4.8), Psalms (45.11–12) and Revelation (12.1–7). A sermon wrongly believed to be by Saint Jerome elaborated on these and was used by standard medieval works such as the Golden Legend and other writers.  The title "Queen of Heaven", or Regina Coeli, for Mary goes back to at least the 12th century.

The subject also drew from the idea of the Virgin as the "throne of Solomon", that is the throne on which a Christ-child sits in a Madonna and Child.  It was felt that the throne itself must be royal. In general the art of this period, often paid for by royalty and the nobility, increasingly regarded the heavenly court as a mirror of earthly ones.

The subject seems to first appear in art, unusually, in England, where a tympanum over the door of the church at Quenington in Gloucestershire of perhaps 1140 may be the earliest surviving depiction, and there is another in Reading, Berkshire. It was rapidly adopted and is prominent in the portals of French Gothic cathedrals such as Senlis, Chartres, Strasbourg, Laon, Notre-Dame de Paris, Amiens and Reims, indeed most 13th-century cathedrals in France.

There are three examples extant on Devon rood screen dados: at East Portlemouth, Holne, and Torbryan.

Composition
In earlier versions, Mary and Christ often sit side-by-side on a wide throne, and typically are only accompanied by angels in smaller altarpieces, although these were often in polyptych form, and had saints on side-panels, now often separated. Later, God the Father often sits to the left of Christ, with the Holy Spirit hovering between them, and Mary kneeling in front and below them. Christ and the Father are normally differentiated by age, and to some extent by costume: God the Father is often wearing a beehive-shaped crown, reminiscent of a Papal tiara. 

By the 15th century, more individual interpretations are found. From the High Renaissance onwards, the subject is often combined with an Assumption as a group of Apostles is on the earthly space below the heavenly scene, sometimes with Mary's empty tomb. As the central panel of altarpieces became larger until it abandoned the predella and side-panels, the Coronation was one subject suited to a very tall composition, especially if it had Apostles or other saints of importance to the community depicted on the lower sections.

Devotion 
The Coronation of the Blessed Virgin is also a subject of devotion throughout Christianity. Beyond art, the Coronation is a central motif in Marian Processions around the world, such as the Grand Marian Procession in Los Angeles, revived by the Queen of Angels Foundation.

Crown of Mary 
The "crown" of Mary has been mentioned since the 6th century, as  "corona virginum" (crown of virgins).  The crown has several meanings in secular depictions. The ancient laurel crown in the Olympic Games signified victory, and a crown in gold and precious stones indicate power and wealth. In Christian iconography, the crown develops religious meanings. In an early mosaic in Ravenna, Italy, virgins present a crown to the child and Mary as a gesture of humility.  The Three kings present their crowns to the newly born Jesus as a symbol  of secular power submitting to Christ.  Marian crowns often include elements of victory and glory, especially during the Baroque period.

A crowned Mary is usually seen in Jesse Trees, which stress her earthly royal descent from the House of David, something accorded considerable importance in the Middle Ages.  In Santa Maria in Trastevere in Rome, she is shown as the mother of Christ, who participates in his kingdom. The Latin text there, adapted from the Song of Songs, reads: Tota pulchra es, amica mea, veni conoravi.

Individual works with articles
 Coronation of the Virgin (Beccafumi)
 Coronation of the Virgin (El Greco, Illescas)
 Coronation of the Virgin (Filippo Lippi), Uffizi
 Marsuppini Coronation by Filippo Lippi, Vatican Museums
 Coronation of the Virgin (Fra Angelico, Louvre)
 Coronation of the Virgin (Fra Angelico, Uffizi)
 Coronation of the Virgin (Gentile da Fabriano)
 Coronation of the Virgin (Lorenzo Monaco)
 Coronation of the Virgin (Rubens),  Hermitage Museum
 Coronation of the Virgin  (Velázquez)
 Coronation of the Virgin Altarpiece'' by Moretto da Brescia
 Oddi Altarpiece, Raphael
The Coronation of the Virgin by Enguerrand Quarton

Gallery

To 1500

Unusual Trinities

Post-1500

Post-1800

See also
 Marian art in the Catholic Church
 Art in Roman Catholicism
 Blessed Virgin Mary
 Canonical Coronation

References

External links

"The Coronation of the Virgin Mary", Augusta State University

Virgin Mary in art
Virgin
Catholic Mariology
Glorious Mysteries